Alexandru Grosu (born 18 April 1988, in Chișinău, Moldavian SSR) is a Moldavian football midfielder who plays for Spartanii Selemet.

External links
 
 Profile at Divizia Nationala
 Profile at FC Tiraspol

1988 births
Footballers from Chișinău
Moldovan footballers
FC Rapid Ghidighici players
FC Tiraspol players
Living people
Association football midfielders
Moldova under-21 international footballers